The D.I.C.E. Award for Online Game of the Year is an award presented annually by the Academy of Interactive Arts & Sciences during the academy's annual D.I.C.E. Awards. This award "celebrates titles of any genre with a significant portion of the gameplay experience transpiring online — collaboratively or competitively. These titles frequently offer excellent matchmaking systems, innovative gameplay options, persistent content releases that further evolve gameplay, user customization and fluidity of gameplay. Titles submitted in this category are not limited to release within the calendar year but must be supported by significant new content. The first winner was Ultima Online at the 1st Annual Interactive Achievement Awards. It was replaced by the Outstanding Achievement in Online Gameplay, which was "presented to the individual or team whose work represents the highest level of achievement in online game play in an interactive title. These titles frequently offer excellent matchmaking systems, innovative gameplay options including collaborative and competitive gameplay, user customization and fluidity of gameplay." It is the only "Game of the Year award" that has been also offered as an "Outstanding Achievement award".

The award's most recent winner is Final Fantasy XIV: Endwalker, developed and published by Square Enix.

History
The 2nd Annual Interactive Achievement Awards (1999) had multiple online awards for specific game genres. This would be reverted at the 3rd Annual Interactive Achievement Awards (2000). It would be renamed Online Gameplay of the Year in 2001 and 2002, then Online Gameplay Game of the Year in 2003. There would be no award offered at the 7th Annual Interactive Achievement Awards. At the 8th Annual Interactive Achievement Awards, the Online Gameplay Game of the Year was replaced by the Outstanding Achievement in Online Gameplay.  It would be offered as the Online Game of the Year in 2014, but would be offered as the Outstanding Achievement in Online Gameplay in 2015. It would be permanently offered as Online Game of the Year starting at the 22nd Annual D.I.C.E. Awards in 2019.
Online Game of the Year (1998, 2000, 2014, 2019—present)
Online Action/Strategy Game of the Year (1999)
Online Family/Board Game of the Year (1999)
Online Role Playing Game of the Year (1999)
Online Gameplay of the Year (2001—2002)
Online Gameplay Game of the Year (2003)
Outstanding Achievement in Online Gameplay 2005—2013, 2015—2018)

Winners and nominees

1990s

2000s

2010s

2020s

Multiple nominations and wins

Developers and publishers 
The most nominated developers are Bungie, Blizzard Entertainment, DICE, Epic Games, and Infinity Ward. Which have all won twice, and so has Origin Systems. Origin Systems is also the only developer with back-to-back wins. Activision has published the most nominees, but Electronic Arts has published the most winners. Electronic Arts is the only publisher for back-to-back winners.

Franchises 
The most nominated franchises have been Call of Duty, Battlefield, and Halo, which have all won twice. The only other two-time winning franchise is Ultima, which is the only franchise with back-to-back wins.

There have numerous games that have been nominated multiple times:
Ultima Online: Won in 1998, the expansion pack The Second Age won in 1999, and the expansion pack Renaissance was nominated in 2001.
MechWarrior 4: Vengeance: Won in 2001 and the expansion pack Black Knight was nominated in 2002.
Borderlands 2 was nominated in 2013 and 2014.
Diablo III was nominated in 2013 and 2014.
World of Tanks won in 2014 and the Xbox 360 version was nominated in 2015.
Destiny won in 2015 and the expansion pack, The Taken King was nominated in 2016.
Hearthstone: Heroes of Warcraft was nominated in 2015, 2016, and 2017.
Destiny 2 was nominated in 2018, the expansion pack Destiny 2: Forsaken was nominated in 2019, and the expansion pack Destiny 2: Shadowkeep was nominated in 2020.
Fortnite was nominated in 2018 and won in 2019.
Final Fantasy XIV: Endwalker was nominated in 2022 and won in  2023.
Ultima Online is the only game to have won twice, and is one of three games nominated three times. The other games being Hearthstone: Heroes of Warcraft and Destiny 2. Fortnite and Final Fantasy XIV: Endwalker are the only games that lost their first nomination and won their second nomination.

Notes

References 

D.I.C.E. Awards
Awards established in 1998
Awards for best video game